Empire of Karn is an adventure game released for the Commodore 64 in 1985 by Interceptor Software. It's a sequel to The Heroes Of Karn from 1983.  It was written by Ian Gray with music and graphics by Chris Cox.

Reception

References

External links

1985 video games
Adventure games
Amstrad CPC games
Commodore 64 games
Europe-exclusive video games
Video game sequels
Video games developed in the United Kingdom